The Chinon Nuclear Power Plant is near the town of Avoine in the Indre et Loire département, on the river Loire (approximately 10 km from the town of Chinon) in central France. The power station has seven reactors, of which three have been closed.

Operation
It employs approximately 1,350 full-time workers. The operator is Électricité de France (EDF).

Performance
The site houses three of the first generation of French plants, of UNGG-type (similar to the Magnox design), which have now closed. Four of the first French PWR series were later built on the site. The site has four cooling towers, designed to be low-profile in order to minimise the visual impact on the Loire.

It is larger than most French plants and feeds approximately 6% of French electricity demand.

Events
During the unusually cold 1986-87 winter, the water intake from the river, as well as several other important pieces of equipment and machinery, froze.
On 21 December 2005, sand accumulated inside the tertiary cooling circuit, threatening to block it. This could have stopped cooling of all the reactors.
On 4 September 2008, some industrial oil was accidentally discharged to the river in a maintenance operation. It was not radioactively contaminated.
On 30 April 2009, a bomb alert caused an evacuation of the plant and an intervention by several units of army security forces.

Other info
Since 1986, the closed Chinon A1 reactor has been redeveloped to hold the French Atom Museum.
The INTRA (INTervention Robotic on Accidents) group, a national nuclear event emergency intervention group equipped with remotely guided, radiation hardened machinery, has its headquarters at the plant.

Reactors

See also

Nuclear decommissioning

External links

http://www.geniustour.com/en/pages/detail.php?j=Nuclear-Museum-of-Chinon

Nuclear power stations in France
Buildings and structures in Indre-et-Loire
Électricité de France